Sixteen Daughters and No Father (German: Sechzehn Töchter und kein Papa) is a 1928 German silent comedy film directed by Adolf Trotz and starring Paul Graetz and Camilla Spira.

The film's art direction was by August Rinaldi.

Cast
In alphabetical order
 Maly Delschaft 
 Lia Eibenschütz 
 Paul Graetz 
 Helmut Körnig 
 René Molnar 
 Anton Pointner 
 Else Reval 
 Camilla Spira 
 Walter Steinbeck
 Kurt Vespermann 
 Emmy Wyda

References

Bibliography
 James Robert Parish. Film Actors Guide. Scarecrow Press, 1977.

External links

1928 films
Films of the Weimar Republic
German silent feature films
Films directed by Adolf Trotz
German black-and-white films
German comedy films
1928 comedy films
Silent comedy films
1920s German films